Top Wing is a Canadian computer-animated television series created by Matthew Fernandes of Industrial Brothers. It was produced in-house by Industrial Brothers in connection with 9 Story Media Group. In Canada, the series debuted on Treehouse on January 6, 2018. Nickelodeon acquired the rights to the show outside of Canada, and it premiered on Nickelodeon in the United States on November 6, 2017. In the UK, the main cast's voices are dubbed with British voice actors, replacing their original Canadian voices.

On May 22, 2018, it was announced that the series had been renewed for a second season, which premiered on March 1, 2019. Since May 31, 2019, new episodes moved to the Nick Jr. channel in the United States.

Description
Taking place on Big Swirl Island, an island inhabited by birds and other animals, Top Wing follows four eager young birds—Swift, Brody, Penny, and Rod—who work together at Top Wing Academy as new cadets to earn their wings by helping their community. With the help of mentor Speedy, the cadets take on different missions for their rescue skills and also help those in need, all while learning important lessons.

Characters

Main
Swift (voiced by Jonah Wineberg in Season 1 and Tristan Mercado in Season 2 in the US, and William Romain in the UK) is a blue jay, who is the leader of Team Top Wing and really great at flying high up in the sky. His signature color is orange, and his vehicles are the Flash Wing jet and the Zip Flash jet-copter.
Rod (voiced by Ethan Pugiotto in the US, and Freddie Howson in the UK) is a rooster who's ready to drive around the island with his all-terrain vehicle. He's also the comic relief cadet. His signature color is red, and his vehicles are the Road Wing roadster and the Rooster Booster motorcycle.
Brody (voiced by Lucas Kalechstein in the US, and Leni Hamilton in the UK) is a puffin who loves to fly with the waves, over and on. His signature color is green, and his vehicles are the Splash Wing boat and the Splash Diver boat and submarine hybrid.
Penny (voiced by Abigail Oliver in the US, and Mili Patel in the UK) is a penguin who is an expert at undersea life in her submarine and the only female cadet. Her signature color is pink, and her vehicles are the Aqua Wing submarine and the Aqua Runner submarine.
Speedy (voiced by Colin Doyle in the US, and Brad Kavanagh in Seasons 1 to 2 in the UK) helps out the Top Wing cadets. He is their ace instructor. He pilots the HQ Command Flyer.
Bea (voiced by Bryn McAuley in the US, and Charlotte Reynard in the UK) is the female chief mechanic who helps out at HQ with Speedy.
Chirp and Cheep are two baby chicks who are seen with the Top Wing cadets. Chirp has two pink feathers on her head, while Cheep has two blue feathers on his head. They can only say their own names.

Recurring
Rhonda (voiced by Raven Dauda in the US, and Fiona Clarke in the UK) is the owner of The Lemon Shack.
Oscar (voiced by Joseph Motiki) is a blue octopus.
Farmer Treegoat (voiced by Jonathan Potts) is a tree goat.
Sammy Monkey (voiced by Tyler Barish in the US, and Hari Patel in the UK) is a little monkey.
Shirley Squirrley (voiced by Bryn McAuley in the US, and Kathryn MacColl in the UK) is a squirrel who enjoys flying, thus she dons wings like those on a flying squirrel.
Timmy Turtle (voiced by Meesha Contreras in the US, and Kathryn MacColl in the UK) is a young turtle who's Honu's son and he's the leader of the Junior Cadets.
Honu Turtle  (voiced by Linda Ballantyne) is Timmy's mom and works as a conductor for the Turtle Train.
Dina (voiced by TJ McGibbson in the US, and Kathryn MacColl in the UK) is a young rhino.
Ms. Brownbear (voiced by Julie Sype in the US, and Fiona Clarke in the UK) is the student's teacher.
Commodore Herky J. Smurkturkski III (voiced by Scott Law in the US, and Rob Foster in the UK) is an announcer turkey
The Turkskis (voiced by Scott Law) are Commodore Smurkturkski's three little chicks 
Tina Treegoat (voiced by Lacey-Lee Evin in the US, and Kathryn MacColl in the UK) is a young tree goat who's Grady's daughter and she's one of the Junior Cadets
Grady Treegoat (voiced by Cory Doran) is Tina's dad
Ward Beaver (voiced by Tal Bachman) is Wally's dad
June Beaver (voiced by Stacey DePass) is Wally's mom
Wally Beaver (voiced by Tyler Barish in the US, and Hari Patel in the UK) is a young beaver who's June and Ward's son and he's one of the Junior Cadets
Anyu PolarBear (voiced by Piper Hook in the US, and Kathryn MacColl in the UK) is a young polar bear who befriends with Penny and she's one of the Junior Cadets
Yuka PolarBear (voiced by Jayden Greig) is Anyu's brother
Mr. PolarBear (voiced by Joanathan Potts) is Anyu and Yuka's dad
Salty Seawalrus (voiced by Matthew Sweet) is Penny's walrus friend
T (voiced by Lyon Smith) is one of Brody's Friends
Shelley (voiced by Julie Sype in Season 1 and Alexa Torrington in Season 2) is one of Brody's friends
Reg Goosling (voiced by Paul Braunstein) is Ryan's dad
Ryan Goosling (voiced by Christian Distefano) is Reg and Mama Goosling's son
Mama Goosling (voiced by Kim Deal) is Ryan's mom
Earl the Gadget Squirrel (voiced by Benjamin Kowalewicz) is an inventor

Minor
Captain Gander (voiced by Scott Law)
Mama Bear (voiced by Josie Cotton) is Bertha's mom
Papa Bear (voiced by Mark Oliver Everett) is Bertha's dad
Bertha Bear (voiced by Nissae Isen) is a little bear cub
Chickster, Chuckster, Chitter, Chatter, Clucky and Bob are Chirp and Cheep's cousins
Snow Geese
Brenda (voiced by Zoe Hatz in the US and Kathryn MacColl in the UK) is Brody's little sister
Bill (voiced by Vaden Todd Lewis in the US, and Rob Foster in the UK) is Brody's dad
Beth (voiced by Liz Phair in the US, and Kathryn MacColl in the UK) is Brody's mom
Sandy Stork (voiced by Alanis Morissette) is a stork who rides on her plane
Ma (voiced by Holly McNarland in the US, and Kathryn MacColl in the UK) is Rod's mom
Pa (voiced by Ben Gibbard in the US, and Rob Foster in the UK) is Rod's dad
Romeo (voiced by Jaiden Cannatelli) is Rod's little brother
Rudy, Ronald, Ruben, Rachel, Rebecca and Ruslana are Rod's little brothers and sisters
Survivor Bear (voiced by Terry McGurrin) is Big Swirl Island's TV Star
Inspector Eagle-Eye (voiced by Mike Ness) is the Inspector who trains the Cadets at the Cadet Challenge as they pass
Roland the Rhino (voiced by Devin Mack) is a doorman who keeps the Cadets away
Tya, Teddy, Toots, Tomba, and Tippy Top are Tina's five cousins
Niko (voiced by Christian Campbell) is Rhonda's nephew 
Rosie (voiced by Shechinah Mpulmwana) is Rhonda's cousin
CJay (voiced by Ian Thornley) is Swift's grandpa
David "Davey" Hasselhawg (voiced by David Berni) is a lifeguard of Big Swirl Beach
Mrs. Penguin (voiced by Laura Ballance) is Penny' mom
Patrick (voiced by Chris Hall) is Penny's dad
Petey (voiced by Wyatt White in Season 2) is Penny's little brother
Phoebe, Precious, Phoenix, Portia, Presley and Pascal are Penny's little brothers and sisters
Santa Claus (voiced by Mike Herrera) is a polar bear
Trini Treegoat
Finn (voiced by Nicholas Fry) is Brenda's best friend
The Dodos (voiced by Deryck Whibley, Forrest Kline, Heather Nova, and Darryl Palumbo)
Della Dodo (voiced by Molly Lewis) is a young dodo
Meggy, Greggy, Suzette, and Egguardo Dodo are Della's little brothers and sisters

Antagonists
Captain Dilly (voiced by Cory Doran in the US, and Rob Foster in the UK) is a pirate alligator
Matilda (voiced by Annick Obonsawin in the US, and Kathryn MacColl in the UK) is Captain Dilly's pirate mate
Baddy McBat (voiced by Cory Doran in the US, and Hari Patel in the UK) is a male bat who flies on his jet
Betty McBat (voiced by Stacey DePass in the US, and Kathryn MacColl in the UK) is a female bat who drives on her bike
Rocco (voiced by Taylor Abrahamse in Seasons 1 to 2) is an alligator who rides on his boat
Chomps (voiced by Christian Martyn in Seasons 1 to 2) is a crocodile who dives on his sub
Banana Bandits (voiced by Ryan Key, Adam Gontier and Jason Wade) are three monkey bandits
Margo the Monkey (voiced by Julie Lemieux) is a female monkey
Captain Swabby is Captain Dilly's aunt

Episodes

Broadcast

Top Wing debuted on Nickelodeon internationally in early 2018, outside of Canada.

Translations

Top Wing has been translated into French, and this version airs in Canada on Telequebec. The French-language version of the show is available online as part of Telequebec's free streaming service for children's programming called CouCou TV. The characters' names do not change in French, and the school is referred to as Academie Top Wing. The Bangla version was shown on Duronto TV in Bangladesh on 2020-2021.

Merchandising

DVD
Nickelodeon, and Paramount Home Entertainment released a DVD of the show on March 5, 2019. In France, TF1 Video will publish the series soon on DVD.

Awards and nominations

References

External links
Official website at Nick Jr. US (archived)
Official website at Nick Jr. International (archived)
Official website at Treehouse TV (archived)

2010s Canadian animated television series
2020s Canadian animated television series
2017 Canadian television series debuts
2020 Canadian television series endings
Canadian children's animated action television series
Canadian children's animated adventure television series
English-language television shows
Television series by 9 Story Media Group
Nickelodeon original programming
Nick Jr. original programming
Treehouse TV original programming
Canadian computer-animated television series
Animated television series about birds
Television series about chickens
Animated television series about penguins
Canadian preschool education television series
Animated preschool education television series
2010s preschool education television series
2020s preschool education television series